George Doukas Philanthropenos (died before 1452) was a close confidant of Byzantine Emperor John VIII Palaiologos (r. 1425–1448) and served briefly as mesazon (chief minister) of the Byzantine Empire in 1438–1439.

He first appears in 1429. John VIII entrusted him with the symbolically important diplomatic missions of conferring the insignia of Despot to the Serbian rulers Đurađ Branković (in 1429 or 1435) and Lazar Branković (in 1446). In 1438–1439 he accompanied John VIII to the Council of Ferrara, and was appointed joint mesazon along with Manuel Iagaris Palaiologos. In this capacity he played an important role, putting pressure on the Byzantine delegation to accept the Union of the Churches.

He was a relative of the Patriarch of Constantinople Joseph II, who died in 1439 during the Council. George left an endowment to the church of Santa Maria Novella in Florence, where Joseph was buried, for an annual mass in his memory.

References

Sources 
  

15th-century deaths
15th-century Byzantine people
Byzantine officials
George Doukas
Year of birth unknown
Ambassadors to Serbia